Houtain-le-Val Castle  is a château in Houtain-le-Val, Wallonia, in the municipality of Genappe, Walloon Brabant, Belgium.

The first castle on the site is believed to have been built by Walter de Holton, first lord of Houtain, in 1129. When it was restored in 1850, two small towers were added. The present owners are the descendants of the Comte de Moerkerke

See also
List of castles in Belgium

External links
Château de Houtain-le-Val, www.belgian castles

Castles in Belgium
Castles in Walloon Brabant
Genappe